The Acadian Peninsula is situated in the northeastern corner of New Brunswick, Canada, encompassing portions of Gloucester and Northumberland Counties. It derives its name from the large Acadian population located there. Two major islands off the northeast tip of the peninsula, Lamèque Island and Miscou Island, are culturally considered part of the Acadian Peninsula.

Most settlement in the peninsula occurred as a result of the Expulsion of the Acadians during the Gulf of St. Lawrence Campaign (1758), where British personnel forcibly removed them from their homes, mostly in southern New Brunswick and Nova Scotia.

Fishing is the dominant industry on the peninsula, with a large agricultural sector as well. The disappearance of the Lady Audette and Lady Dorianne vessels in 1970/71 shocked the peninsula. Peat bogs are found in the Shippagan and Lameque areas.

List of major towns 
Major towns on the Acadian Peninsula include:
 Caraquet
 Shippagan
 Tracadie
 Neguac
 Lamèque (on Lamèque Island)

See also 
Acadian World Congress

External links 
 Official page

Acadia
Peninsulas of New Brunswick
Landforms of Gloucester County, New Brunswick
Landforms of Northumberland County, New Brunswick
Geographic regions of New Brunswick